Kolstad's Cabinet governed Norway from 12 May 1931 to 14 March 1932. The Agrarian Party cabinet was led by Prime Minister Peder Kolstad. It had the following composition:

Cabinet members

References

Notes

Kolstad
Kolstad
1931 establishments in Norway
1932 disestablishments in Norway
Cabinets established in 1931
Cabinets disestablished in 1932